When Lincoln Paid is a 1913 American short silent historical drama film written by William Clifford and directed by Francis Ford, who also appears in the film as Abraham Lincoln. Ford portrayed Lincoln in at least seven silent films; all are now lost except for this one.

Plot
The mother of a dead Union soldier attempts to convince President Lincoln to pardon a similarly condemned Confederate soldier whose unjust conviction was the result of her vindictive scheme.

Cast
Francis Ford as Abraham Lincoln
Jack Conway
Charles Edler (billed as Charles Elder)
Ethel Grandin

Background
This was one of many films from the 1910s focusing on Lincoln's well-known practice of pardoning young Civil War soldiers condemned to die, if any extenuating circumstances might have been involved.

Preservation status
When Lincoln Paid was thought to be lost until a contractor who was demolishing a barn in Nelson, New Hampshire discovered a 35mm Monarch projector and seven reels of film. Among the seven reels was a nitrate print of When Lincoln Paid. The contractor donated the reels to the Keene State College Film Society. When Lincoln Paid was restored and was screened at Keene State College in April 2010.

See also
List of rediscovered films

References

External links

1913 films
1910s war drama films
1913 short films
American Civil War films
American war drama films
American historical films
American silent short films
American black-and-white films
Fictional depictions of Abraham Lincoln in film
Films directed by Francis Ford
Films set in the 1860s
1910s rediscovered films
Rediscovered American films
1910s American films
Silent American drama films
Silent war drama films